The Culpeper Basin is one of the Newark Supergroup's Triassic rift basins. It lies east of the Appalachian Mountains and extends from the Madison County—Orange County line in Virginia to Frederick, Maryland. A diverse group of sedimentary rocks including siltstone, sandstone, and congolmerate within the basin were intruded by igneous rocks (primarily diabase), which caused thermal metamorphism at the contact with sedimentary rock.

The Culpeper Basin is nearly continuous with the Gettysburg Basin to the north and with the Barboursville Basin to the south.

The Groveton Member of the Bull Run Formation is exposed there. The formation has produced disarticulated fish remains including isolated bones and scales.

The large body of diabase in central Montgomery County, Maryland, is known as the Boyds Sill, named after the town of Boyds.

Footnotes

References
 Hunt, ReBecca K., Vincent L. Santucci and Jason Kenworthy. 2006. "A preliminary inventory of fossil fish from National Park Service units." in S.G. Lucas, J.A. Spielmann, P.M. Hester, J.P. Kenworthy, and V.L. Santucci (ed.s), Fossils from Federal Lands. New Mexico Museum of Natural History and Science Bulletin 34, pp. 63–69.

Geology of Maryland